Sangili is a 1982 Indian Tamil-language action drama film, directed by C. V. Rajendran and produced by S. D. Gunasekaran. The film stars Sivaji Ganesan, Prabhu (in his debut film appearance), Sripriya, Major Sundarrajan, Sumithra and M. N. Nambiar. It is a remake of the 1976 Hindi film Kalicharan. The film was released on 14 April 1982.

Plot 
Inspector-General Sivaraj (Major Sundarrajan) appoints his son and fellow police officer, the talented and steadfast DSP Saravanan Sivaraj(Sivaji Ganesan)as the Special Officer in-charge of tracking down a virulent, anti-national smuggling ring. Saravanan is a widower with two kids who are being raised by his sister Ganga (Sumithra). When Saravanan gets some firm clues that a reputed local businessman and philanthropist 'Lion' Dayanidhi (M. N. Nambiar) could be the king-pin behind the cartel, Dayanidhi has him killed. Soon after, a distraught Sivaraj is introduced by a friend to a ferocious criminal lodged in Vellore prison named Sangili (Sivaji Ganesan's dual role) who remarkably resembles his son Saravanan in appearance. Sivaraj decides to reform and train the brutish Sangili to impersonate Saravanan in order to trace those behind Saravanan's death. Sivaraj finds transforming Sangili a seemingly impossible task as Sangili refuses to mend his ways and has his own agenda of seeking revenge against his sister's murderer, but eventually succeeds with some help from Ganga and Saravanan's kids. Sangili, now transposing as Saravanan, launches himself into tracking the real Saravanan's killers and bringing down the smuggling cartel.

Cast 

Sivaji Ganesan as DSP Saravanan Sivaraj/ Sangili
Sripriya
Prabhu as Rajali
M. N. Nambiar Tiger Dyanidhi/ LION, leader of a smuggling ring
Major Sundarrajan IGP Sivaraj
R. S. Manohar
Suruli Rajan
Vennira Aadai Moorthy
V. S. Raghavan
Y. G. Mahendra
Sumithra
Manorama
Roja Ramani
S. N. Lakshmi

Production 
The film marked the cinematic acting debut of Prabhu, son of Sivaji Ganesan. Ganesan was initially against Prabhu acting in the film as he wanted him to join the police. Prabhu too was not initially interested in pursuing an acting career, but Rajendran insisted him to act in the film.

Soundtrack 
Soundtrack was composed by M. S. Viswanathan, with lyrics by Kannadasan.

Reception 
Kalki negatively reviewed the film, comparing it unfavourably to the original and said the remake looked hastily made.

References

External links 
 

1980s Tamil-language films
1982 action films
1982 films
Films directed by C. V. Rajendran
Films scored by M. S. Viswanathan
Indian action drama films
Tamil remakes of Hindi films